Iturbe may refer to: 

 Iturbe, Jujuy, Argentina
 Iturbe, Paraguay

People with the surname 
 Antonio Iturbe (born 1967), Spanish writer
 Iker Iturbe (born 1976), Spanish professional basketball player
 Juan Iturbe (born 1993), Argentine-born Paraguayan professional footballer 
 Lola Iturbe (1902–1990), Spanish anarcho-syndicalist
 Lucílo Iturbe (1907–1997), Mexican Olympic sprinter
 Arantxa Iturbe (born 1964), Basque journalist, announcer and writer

See also
 Iturbide (surname)